The 30th edition of the FIBA Korać Cup occurred between September 29, 2000 and April 18, 2001. The competition was won by the Spanish Unicaja, who beat the Yugoslavian Hemofarm in the double finals.

Team allocation 
The labels in the parentheses show how each team qualified for the place of its starting round

 1st, 2nd, etc.: League position after Playoffs
 WC: Wild card

First round 

|}

Round of 64 

|}
</onlyinclude>
Notes

Sources:

Round of 32

Playoffs

Bracket

Round of 16 

|}

Quarterfinals 

|}

Semifinals 

|}

Finals 

|}

See also
2000–01 Euroleague
2000–01 FIBA SuproLeague
2000–01 FIBA Saporta Cup

External links
 2000–01 FIBA Korać Cup @ linguasport.com

References 

2000–01
2000–01 in European basketball